Raymond Maurice Badin (19 March 1928 – 1 March 2000) was a French gymnast. He competed in eight events at the 1952 Summer Olympics.

References

1928 births
2000 deaths
French male artistic gymnasts
Olympic gymnasts of France
Gymnasts at the 1952 Summer Olympics
20th-century French people